Maksim Telitsyn (born 28 December 1990) is a Russian rower.

He won a medal at the 2019 World Rowing Championships.

References

External links

1990 births
Living people
Russian male rowers
Sportspeople from Samara, Russia
World Rowing Championships medalists for Russia